San Serriffe is a fictional island nation invented for April Fools' Day 1977, by Britain's The Guardian newspaper. It was featured in a seven-page hoax supplement, published in the style of contemporary reviews of foreign countries, commemorating the tenth anniversary of the island's independence, complete with themed advertisements from major companies. The supplement provided an elaborate description of the nation as a tourist destination and developing economy, but most of its place names and characters were puns and plays on words relating to printing (such as "sans-serif" and names of common fonts). The original idea was to place the island in the Atlantic Ocean near Tenerife, but because of the ground collision of two Boeing 747s there a few days before publication it was moved to the Indian Ocean, near the Seychelles islands.

San Serriffe was one of the most famous and successful hoaxes of recent decades; it has become part of the common cultural heritage of literary humour, and a secondary body of literature has been derived from it. The nation was reused for similar hoaxes in 1978, 1980 and 1999. In April 2009 the geography, history and culture of San Serriffe featured heavily in the paper's cryptic crossword.

Background
The idea for the hoax came from The Guardian'''s Special Reports Manager Philip Davies. In a 2007 interview he said "The Financial Times was always doing special reports on little countries I'd never heard of. I was thinking about April Fool's Day 1977 and I thought, why don't we just make a country up?" Special Reports editor Stuart St Clair Legge suggested the name San Serriffe. Geoffrey Taylor designed the semicolon-shaped map of the island, based on a shrunken version of New Zealand.

Initially, the supplement featuring the fictitious archipelago was to be a single page.  However, the newspaper realised that a larger, more in-depth review would generate greater revenue by running themed advertising alongside the text. These included a request for submissions to a photography competition sponsored by Kodak: "If you've got a photograph of San Serriffe, Kodak would like to see it."

Reception
In an era before the widespread use of desktop publishing and word processing software, much of the terminology was little-known, the jokes were easily missed, and many readers were fooled. Despite this, many others recognised the joke and became part of it. The Guardian received hundreds of letters from readers describing memorable holidays to the islands. It also received a letter from the "San Serriffe Liberation Front" critical of the pro-government slant to the supplement.

Editor Peter Preston received letters of complaint from airlines and travel agents due to the disruption caused by customers who refused to believe the islands did not exist.

Legacy
A large body of secondary work about San Serriffe has been written since 1977. A Friends of San Serriffe club was established, with its "life president" writing annual April Fools' Day letters to the paper. Bird & Bull Press published several books about esoteric subjects relating to the country, including Booksellers of San Serriffe, First Fine Silver Coinage of the Republic of San Serriffe and The World's Worst Marbled Papers.

Donald Knuth offers a reward to anyone finding a mistake in one of his publications, and from October 2008 onwards this has been in the form of a "certificate of deposit" from the fictitious Bank of San Serriffe.

See also
 Fictitious entry
 List of April Fools' Day jokes
 Freedonia, of Marx Brothers fame
 List of fictional countries
 Phaic Tăn, another fictitious country
 Molvanîa, a parody travel guide for another fictitious country
 San Sombrèro, a parody travel guide for the eponymous fictitious country
 San Escobar, another fictitious country

References

Sources

 
 
 
 
 
 
 

 External links 
 Museum of Hoaxes the history of the hoax, with pictures of the entire supplement
 Foolish things, David McKie, The Guardian, 1 April 2006 explaining how the original hoax came about and the impact it caused
 Some rough guides to San Seriffe, The Guardian, 5 April 1999
 How young Tony Blair tuned into a new type of politics, The Guardian, 2 April 1999
 Return to San Serriffe, Berlin Sans, The Guardian, 1 April 1999
 The leader's rise to power in San Serriffe, Mark Arnold-Forster, The Guardian, 1 April 1977
 Spiking the cultural roots, Tim Radford, The Guardian'', 1 April 1977
 Guardian article with high-resolution scan of first page, 27 March 2012
  – 2007 April Fools Project.
 The Semicolonial Island Nation of San Serriffe at UCSB Geography 
 The Beautiful Island of San Serriffe with reproductions of all pages.

Fictional elements introduced in 1977
April Fools' Day jokes
Fictional countries
Fictional islands
The Guardian
Journalistic hoaxes
Typography
Hoaxes in the United Kingdom
1977 hoaxes
1977 in the United Kingdom
Fictional island countries
Fictional African countries